The Directors Guild of America Award for Outstanding Directorial Achievement in Commercials is one of the annual Directors Guild of America Awards given by the Directors Guild of America. It was first awarded at the 32nd Directors Guild of America Awards in 1980.

Winners and nominees

1970s

1980s

1990s

2000s

2010s

2020s

Individuals with multiple awards
3 awards
 Joe Pytka 

2 awards
 Leslie Dektor
 Nicolai Fuglsig
 James Gartner
 Stuart Hagmann (consecutive)
 Spike Jonze (consecutive)
 Richard Levine
 Robert Lieberman
 Noam Murro
 Martin de Thurah

Individuals with multiple nominations

15 nominations
 Joe Pytka

13 nominations
 Leslie Dektor

9 nominations
 Fredrik Bond

8 nominations
 Noam Murro

7 nominations
 Dante Ariola
 Richard Levine

6 nominations
 James Gartner
 Craig Gillespie
 Tom Kuntz

5 nominations
 Stuart Hagmann

4 nominations
 Lance Acord
 Steve Ayson
 Robert Lieberman

3 nominations
 Bryan Buckley
 Spike Jonze
 Richard Loew
 Rocky Morton
 Martin de Thurah
 Kinka Usher

2 nominations
 Frank Budgen
 Juan Cabral
 Adam Cameron
 Simon Cole
 David Cornell
 William Dear
 David Fincher
 Nicolai Fuglsig
 Bob Giraldi
 Michael Grasso
 Miles Jay
 Tony Kaye
 Rupert Sanders
 David Shane
 Tarsem Singh
 Baker Smith

References

External links
  (official website)

Directors Guild of America Awards
Advertising awards